Ernesto Gómez Sánchez (born 5 March 1982) is a Spanish former footballer who is last known to have played as a midfielder or forward for Pinatar.

Career

As a youth player, Gómez joined the youth academy of Real Madrid, Spain's most successful club.

In 2002, he signed for Toledo in the Spanish third division from the reserves of Real Madrid.

In 2006, he signed for Spanish fourth division side Horadada.

In 2009, Gómez signed for Niki Volos in the Greek lower leagues.

In 2010, he signed for Greek second division team Veria, where he made 9 appearances and scored 1 goal.

In 2015, Gómez signed for Orihuela in the Spanish fourth division after a trial and playing for Spanish fifth division outfit Horadada.

Before the second half of 2015/16, he signed for Hong Kong Rangers in Hong Kong after being released by Orihuela.

References

External links
 Ernesto Gómez at playmakerstats.com
 
 

Spanish footballers
Living people
Footballers from Murcia
Expatriate footballers in Hong Kong
Hong Kong Premier League players
Association football midfielders
Association football forwards
Spanish expatriate sportspeople in Greece
Spanish expatriate sportspeople in Hong Kong
Hong Kong Rangers FC players
Veria F.C. players
Segunda División B players
Real Madrid Castilla footballers
CD Toledo players
RCD Mallorca B players
Girona FC players
Real Valladolid Promesas players
Tercera División players
UD Horadada players
CD Binéfar players
CD Cieza players
CD Torrevieja players
Orihuela CF players
Mar Menor FC players
1982 births
Spanish expatriate footballers
Expatriate footballers in Greece